Fernando Buesa Arena is an indoor sports arena in Vitoria-Gasteiz, Spain. It is primarily used for basketball and is the home arena of Saski Baskonia.

History
The history and evolution of this sports enclosure has been closely tied to its main user, the basketball team Saski Baskonia of the League ACB.

The arena's seating capacity, for basketball, is up to 15,504 people. Works to increase the arena's seating capacity from 9,923 to 15,504 people began in March 2011, and finished in April 2012.

Buesa Arena again beat the record of attendance against Real Madrid on 3 January 2016, with 15,544 spectators.

Major events

The arena hosted the 1996 European Cup Final, in which local Saski Baskonia won the title and also hosted the 2010 EuroCup Finals.

The Final Eight of the Copa del Rey (Spanish Cup) was played four times at Buesa Arena (2000, 2002, 2008 and 2013).

On 9 April 2012, at the game of Caja Laboral against Real Madrid, Fernando Buesa Arena registered the record of attendance in a basketball game of the Spanish Liga ACB with 15,504 spectators.

The arena has hosted the Euskalgym since 2014, which is one of the biggest and greatest rhythmic gymnastics gala events in the world.

On 3 January 2016, at the game of Laboral Kutxa against Real Madrid, Fernando Buesa Arena registered the new record of attendance in a basketball game of Liga ACB with 15,544 spectators.

It hosted the 2019 EuroLeague Final Four, registering an average attendance of 13,239 spectators in the four hosted games.

Attendances
This is a list of league and EuroLeague games attendances of Baskonia at Fernando Buesa Arena since the last expansion was completed.

See also
 List of indoor arenas in Spain

References

External links

Fernando Buesa Arena Official Website
2011-2012 Expansion Report

Indoor arenas in Spain
Saski Baskonia
Basketball venues in Spain
Sports venues in the Basque Country (autonomous community)